A list of notable films produced in Greece in the 2000s.

2000s

External links
 Greek film at the IMDb

2000s
Lists of 2000s films
Films